The area around Wiesloch, Germany, is a historical centre for mining, running between Roman times and the earlier 2000s.  The area is situated on the eastern edge of the Upper Rhine Plain and contains large concentrations of carbonate-hosted lead-zinc ore deposits.  Lime for cement is still actively mined in the vicinity, with most of the clay pits closed, and the last heavy metal mine operated until 1953 by Stolberger Zink.  On top of the escarpment metals and lime have been mined, with clay and sand mined at the end of the valley floor where faulting has brought different layers closer to the surface.

During the 11th century, around ~100 tonnes of silver is estimated to have been mined, contributing financially to the area and liking funding the creation of Speyer Cathedral.

Along the length of the River Leimbach are spoil tips from historic mining.

The Nussloch quarry extracting lime for cement and belonging to HeidelbergCement was anticipated to reach permitted limits for extraction during the late-2020s.

Overview
The main mines in the vicinity of Wiesloch were: 
 Gottes Segen, zinc-silver deep mines, processed by Stolberger Zink on the surface at the Schafbuckel in Altwiesloch
 Hesseler quarry, processed at the Hessler Kalkwerke in Altwiesloch
 Dämmelwald clay pit, processed by Tonwaren-Industrie Wiesloch near Wiesloch-Walldorf station.  Closed in 1988
 Nussloch clay pit, processed by Stauch at Nussloch
 Frauenweiler sand pit
 Frauenweiler clay pits, ×3, processed at Bott/Trost at Rauenberg
 Malsch clay pit, processed at Malsch

References

Further reading

 
 
 
 
 
 

Wiesloch